In some of the Romance languages the copula, the equivalent of the verb to be in English, is relatively complex compared to its counterparts in other languages. A copula is a word that links the subject of a sentence with a predicate (a subject complement). Whereas English has one main copula verb (and some languages like Russian mostly express the copula implicitly) some Romance languages have more complex forms.

Italian, Portuguese, Spanish, and some other Romance languages have more than one copula verb. Conversely, French and certain others have only one. The development of copula verbs in Romance languages is explained by the fact that these are ultimately derived from three Latin verbs: 
  "to be" (ultimately from Proto-Indo-European , as in English ). The verb  was an irregular, suppletive verb, with some of its forms (e.g.  "I was/I have been") taken from the Proto-Indo-European root  meaning "to become" (as in English ).
  "to stand" or "to stay" (ultimately from Proto-Indo-European , as in English  and German ).
  "to sit" (ultimately from Proto-Indo-European , as in English ).  

As the Romance languages developed over time, the three separate Latin verbs became just one or two verbs in the Romance languages.

The reduction of three separate verbs into just one or two appears to have occurred as follows:
The irregular infinitive  was remodeled into .

The development of two copular verbs in this manner occurred most completely in Spanish, Portuguese and Catalan.  In other languages, most usages of English "to be" are still translated by :
In Italian, the infinitive essere continues Latin  as existential 'to be', while stare has the primary meaning "to stay" and is used as a copula only in a few situations: to express one's state of physical health (sto bene "I am well"); to form progressive aspects (sto parlando "I am speaking"); and (especially in the south of Italy) with the meaning of "to be located", although a distinction can be expressed in most varieties of Italian: è in cucina 'it's in the kitchen (where it usually is)' versus sta in cucina 'it's in the kitchen (where it isn't usually located)'. 
In Old French, the verb ester <  maintained the Proto-Romance meaning of "to stand, stay, stop".  In modern French, this verb has almost totally disappeared (see below for the one exception), although the derivative verb of rester ("to remain") exists, and some parts of the conjugation of ester have become incorporated into être "to be" < . As a result of this complex evolution, even though French has a single verb for "to be" (être), its conjugation is highly irregular.

History

In English, it is possible to say "there stands..." instead of "there is..." in certain contexts. With time, it became common to use this verb to express other states.

Today, Spanish, Galician, Portuguese, Catalan, and (to a lesser extent) Italian commonly use two copulas, one from each of the Latin verbs.

Examples:
Italian has stato as the past participle of not only stare but also essere, instead of the expected essuto (which, along with suto, we encounter only in mediaeval texts).
Standard Catalan has estat as the past participle of not only estar but also ésser. However, many people use forms such as sigut or sét, which are considered also standard for colloquial speech.
French has été as the past participle of être, which had a complex phonetic development like many words of the language:  → /sˈtatu/ (Vulgar Latin) > /esˈtæðo/ (Proto-Gallo-Romance) > /esˈteθ/ (early Old French) > /ehˈte/ (late Old French) > /eːˈte/ (Middle French) > /ete/ (Modern French).
Notes
Following the standard practice, Latin verbs are quoted here in the first person singular of the present indicative. In other words,  is literally "I am", rather than "to be".
 Only the basic simple tenses are given in the conjugation tables, but all languages below have also numerous compound tenses.
 The asterisk (*) indicates an incorrect or unattested form.

Spanish

Spanish copulas

The Spanish copulas are ser and estar. The latter developed as follows:
 → *estare → estar

The copula ser developed from two Latin verbs.

E.g. derivation from :

 → sea (1st person singular, present tense, subjunctive mood)

Derivation from :

 → somos (1st person plural, present tense, indicative mood)

The infinitive (on which the modern future and conditional are based) could have derived from either or both:

 → èssere (as in Italian) → ésser (as in Catalan) → ser
 → *seder → seer → ser

In the early part of the second millennium, in texts such as the Cantar de Mio Cid, ser was still used mostly as in Latin, and there was little place for estar; sentences like Es pagado, e davos su amor, "He is satisfied, and he gives you his favour" are found, where modern Spanish might have Queda contento, or Está satisfecho, y le da su favor.

As the centuries went by, estar spread in use.  Today, ser is used to express the fundamental nature, identity, essence, or characteristics of something – what it really is, while estar expresses the state or condition something happens to be in.  Indeed, ser is etymologically related to the English words "essence" and "is", and estar with "state", "status", "standing", "stance" and "stay". The distinction is parallel with the concept of essence versus accident. 

The verb quedar (which also has the specific meanings of "to remain", "to be as a result" and others) is often used in a similar way to estar.  It derives from the Latin  ( in the infinitive), "to rest".

Ser

Estar

† Archaic.

†† Estar is usually made reflexive in the imperative.

Nuance

Él es sucio = "He is dirty" (i.e. "He is a dirty person" – characteristic)
Él está sucio = "He is dirty" (i.e. "He has some dirt on him" – state)

Es abierta = "She is open" (i.e. "She is an open sort of person" – characteristic)
Está abierta = "It is open" (probably referring to a door or window – state)

Es triste = "[It/he/she] is sad" (i.e. gloomy – characteristic)
Está triste = "[It/he/she] is sad" (i.e. feeling down – state)

¿Cómo eres? = "What are you like?" (i.e. "describe yourself" – characteristics)
¿Cómo estás? = "How are you?" (i.e. "how are you doing?" – state)

With adjectives referring to beauty and the like, ser means "to be", and estar means "to look".
¡Qué bonita es! = "Wow, she is so beautiful" (characteristic)
¡Qué bonita está! = "Wow, she is looking so beautiful / she is done up so nicely" (state)

The differentiation between "nature" and "state" makes sense when talking about the states of life and death: Él está vivo (He is alive), Él está muerto (He is dead).  Estar is used for both alive and dead, since they are both states, although being dead is considered a permanent state.

Ser is used when stating the stage of life at which a person is.  The old, the young, etc. are seen as groups that one can belong to.  It is a question of identity:
Él es viejo = "He is old"
Él es un viejo = "He is an old man"
Cuando ella era niñita = "When she was a little girl"
However, age can also be presented not as a matter of identity but a state:
Él está viejo = "He is looking old" / "He got old"

The use of estar gives a certain special nuance to some verbs.  For example, estar guapa, though it has the sense of "to be beautiful", also emphasizes the use of make-up and clothes to create a beautiful look.  Ser sucio instead of the more usual estar sucio means to be the sort of person who is likely to be dirty.

The adjective loco ("mad", "crazy", "insane") is always used with estar in Spain, as the implication is that the person "has gone mad" (i.e. a change of state).  It is possible to give it a permanent nuance, but only by using it as a noun: Él es un loco, "He is a madman".  Ser loco is used in certain regions in Latin America, however, meaning a permanent insanity as opposed to estar loco meaning have gone mad or acting crazy.

The expression como una cabra (with the implied loco omitted) is used with estar to mean "mad as a hatter", "crazy as a loon".  Ser como una cabra would literally mean, "to be like a goat".

Ser is used with adjectives of fundamental belief, nationality, sex, intelligence, etc.  The use of estar with francés ("French") would sound quite odd to native Spanish speakers, as though it meant, "to feel a bit French".  Similarly, no estar católico does not mean, "to no longer be Catholic", but is a colloquial expression meaning "to feel under the weather".

It is often stated that the difference between the two verbs corresponds to "permanent" versus "temporary", but it is more accurate to describe the distinction as one of "essential nature" versus "state or condition".  The "essential nature" of things does sometimes change, and this is reflected in the language.  For example, someone who had been depressed for a prolonged period, and then had a life changing experience like a new career or long-term relationship, might say ahora yo soy feliz, meaning, "now I am happy".

Specific constructions requiring ser
A special use of ser, which expresses neither a nature nor a state but an action, is the formation of the passive voice:
Ellos han sido asesinados = "They have been murdered"
Tú serás juzgada = "You will be judged"

Specific constructions requiring estar

Past participles

Estar is usually used with adjectives that derive from past participles of verbs since the use of ser would sound like a verb in the passive voice.  Such adjectives in any case generally refer to states:
La frontera está cerrada = "The border is closed"
Estoy casado = "I am married" (Soy casado is also possible; "I am single", "I am widowed", etc. can use ser or estar as well)

A special example of this tendency is what happens with words indicating prohibition and suchlike.  If an adjective not deriving from a verb were used, then the meaning would definitely require ser.  To say the same thing with a past participle, estar (or quedar) is required, in order to differentiate it from the use of ser with a past participle implying an action expressed in the passive voice:
Es ilegal fumar en este vuelo = "It is illegal to smoke on this flight" (straightforward case of ser)
Está prohibido fumar en este vuelo = "It is prohibited to smoke on this flight" (estar necessary to distinguish the sentence from the following one)
Ha sido prohibido fumar en este vuelo = "It has been prohibited (i.e. made against the rules) to smoke on this flight" (This is an example of the passive voice.  This use of ser in the perfect tense is similar to the use of estar in the present tense; the former expressing an event in the past, the latter expressing its current effect.)

This fine nuance is not encountered in other Romance languages, which do not go to such lengths to distinguish between passives and similar-sounding phrases.

Location
Estar is used to refer to physical location.  In Spanish, location is regarded as a state, and therefore is indicated with estar, even in those cases (e.g. Madrid está en España "Madrid is in Spain") when one might think that it is something so permanent and fundamental that it could be logical to use ser.  The use of estar for location may be easier for English speakers to grasp if they recall that it is derived from Latin , "to stand."

With immobile things, quedar is sometimes used instead of estar, especially when there is a reference to a length of time, or a remaining distance, e.g.:
¿A cuánto queda la playa? / ¿A qué distancia queda la playa? = "How far away is the beach?"
Aún queda lejos = "There is still quite some way" / "It is still far"
El bar queda a cinco minutitos = "The bar is five minutes away"

However, ser can sometimes occur with words such as aquí, which can mislead learners into thinking that physical location can be expressed with ser.  In fact, the verb in this case identifies the place rather than expressing where it is.  For example, one might say to a taxi driver the following phrases, to indicate that one has arrived:
Está aquí = "It is here"
Es aquí = "It is here"

The difference becomes clear if aquí is changed to esta calle:
Está en esta calle = "It is in this street"
Es esta calle = "It is this street"

Es aquí and es esta calle express the idea that "this is the place", a concept quite different from what is expressed by estar.

The only case in which true location is expressed by ser is when an event rather than a physical thing is referred to:
¿Dónde es la fiesta? = "Where is the party?"
¿Dónde está la discoteca? = "Where is the nightclub?"

Words requiring ser
Ser is always used when the complement is a noun or pronoun, regardless of whether the speaker intended to express a fundamental essence (though in practice speakers do tend to express this):
Él es una persona sucia = "He is a dirty person"
Ella es una persona abierta = "She is an open person"
Yo soy la víctima = "I am the victim"

However, it is not always easy to know what is a noun.  For example, pez is a noun meaning "fish", but estar pez is a colloquial expression meaning "not to have a clue" or "to be at sea" at a given activity.

Words requiring estar

Estar must be used when the complement is bien or mal, no matter what meaning is intended.
Este libro está muy bien = Este libro es muy bueno = "This book is very good" (nature)
Estoy muy mal = Estoy muy malo = "I am feeling terrible, ill" (state)

Total change of meaning with specific adjectives
Many adjectives change in meaning entirely depending on the verb used, sometimes meaning almost the opposite.  In each case, the meaning which is more of a "nature" goes with ser and the meaning which is more of a "state" goes with estar.

Happiness
Although "sadness" is expressed straightforwardly with estar triste, "happiness" is a little trickier.  The quality of being joyous, lively and happy is expressed with ser alegre.  This can describe people, music, colours, etc.  Estar alegre expresses the state of being merry, which in practice may sometimes mean "drunk", "tipsy".

A person who is fundamentally happy in life is said to ser feliz; indeed la felicidad is that "happiness" for which humans strive.  This happiness often turns out to be a transitory state, a person may nevertheless declare yo soy feliz as a statement of optimism that goes beyond the description of today's mood that is expressed by any phrase with estar.  As for such moods, they can be expressed with estar feliz.

When not a state but a change of state is referred to, the expression is quedar contento or alegrarse: Ella quedó muy contenta cuando yo le dije que ella había ganado = "she was very glad when I told her that she had won"; Yo me alegro de que vosotros hayáis llegado = "I am glad that you (plural) have come".

In the excerpt from the Cantar de Mio Cid above, one can see that "to be happy" a thousand years ago was ser pagado (meaning "to be paid" in current Spanish).

Portuguese

Portuguese copulas

The Portuguese copulas are ser and estar. As in Spanish, estar derived from Latin  / :
  → *estare → estar
E.g. derivation from :
 → seer → ser (infinitive)
 → seja (1st person singular, present tense, subjunctive mood)
E.g. derivation from :
 → som → sou (1st pers. sing., present tense, indicative mood)
 → era (1st pers. sing., imperfect past tense, indicative mood)
 → fui (1st pers. sing., preterite tense, indicative mood)

Ser

Estar

† Mostly literary.

†† Some authors regard the conditional as a tense of the indicative mood.

Usage 

The distinction between the two verbs is very similar to that of Catalan.  Compared to Spanish, estar is a little less used.  The main difference between Spanish and Portuguese lies in the interpretation of the concept of state versus essence and in the generalisations in some constructions.  There is perhaps a little more of a concept of permanent versus temporary, rather than essence versus state. For example, unlike Spanish, Portuguese does not require estar with past participles; in this case, it follows the general rule regarding state/essence.
A cadeira é [feita] de madeira = "The chair is made of wood".
The word feita, "made", is usually omitted.
Eu sou casado  = "I am married".

The same applies to sentences expressing interdictions:
 É proibido fumar neste voo "Smoking is forbidden on this flight".

However, there are some nuances in these verbs in the passive voice. In this case, the use of ser or estar depends on the tense of the verb. E.g.: to say that somebody is not allowed to smoke, only estar can be used in the present tense:
 Está proibido de fumar [pelo pai] =  "He has been forbidden from smoking [by his father]"; literally "He is forbidden to smoke [by the father]".
In past tenses, both ser and estar can be used, conveying a different meaning:
 Foi proibido de fumar =  "He was forbidden from smoking" [action].
 Estava proibido de fumar =  "He was forbidden from smoking" [result].

Portuguese counts location as permanent and fundamental, and accordingly uses ser, or the more specific secondary copula ficar (to stay), from Latin , "to place/set":
Lisboa fica em Portugal "Lisbon is [located] in Portugal".
Onde é/fica o apartamento dela? "Where is her flat/apartment?"
but:
A cidade está (situada) a 10 quilômetros da capital. "The city is (situated) 10 km from the capital."

Nuance

Como és? =  "What are you like?" (i.e. "Describe yourself" – characteristics).
Como estás? =  "How are you?" (i.e. "How are you doing?" – state).

Ele é triste =  "He is sad" (i.e. gloomy – characteristic).
(Ele) está triste =  "He is [feeling] sad" (i.e. feeling down – state).

Ela é aberta =  "She is open" (i.e. "She is an open-minded sort of person" – characteristic; this sentence can also have a pejorative meaning).
Ela está aberta =  "It is open" (probably referring to a door or window – state).

É sujo =  "It is dirty" (i.e. "It is a dirty place/thing" – characteristic).
Está sujo =  "It is dirty" (i.e. "The place is/looks dirty [now]" – state).

With adjectives referring to beauty and the like, ser means "to be", and estar means "to look".
Que linda ela é! =  "She is so beautiful!" (characteristic).
Que linda ela está! =  "She looks so beautiful!" (state).

As in Spanish, the differentiation between "nature" and "state" makes sense when talking about the states of life and death: Está vivo (He is alive); Está morto (He is dead).
Notice the important difference between ser morto (to be killed) and estar morto (to be dead):
Ele foi morto [por um ladrão] =  "He was killed [by a burglar]".

Louco (mad) can be used with ser or estar, giving different connotations:

És louco! =  "You are mad!" (characteristic).
Estás louco! =  "You have gone mad!"/ "You are acting crazy" (state).

Ser is used with adjectives expressing:
 fundamental belief: Não sou católico "I am not a Catholic";
 nationality: És português "You are Portuguese";
 gender:  É um homem "He is a man";
 intelligence: Somos espertos "We are clever", etc.

Estar católico is used with the same sense as in Spanish:

Eu não estou muito católico =  "I am not feeling very well" (perhaps mean-spirited or ill or drunk).
O tempo hoje não está muito católico =  "The weather is not very reliable today".

Apart from this exception, due to its different meanings, estar cannot be used for nationality, gender, or intelligence, but one can say Estou abrasileirado (I have acquired Brazilian ways – state) or Estás americanizado (You have been Americanised – state).
The same applies for the difference between É um homem "He is a man" and Está um homem, meaning, "He has grown up to be a man".

Ficar, apart from its use as "to stay", and the use mentioned above as a copula translated as "to be located", is extensively used for a change of state (sometimes quite sudden), being translated as "to get" or "to become":
 Fiquei rico =  "I got rich."
 Ficou triste =  "He became sad."

Catalan

Catalan copulas
The Catalan copulas developed as follows:
 → éssere → ésser → esser → ser
 → *estare → estar
 → seure

The last three forms of the first verb survive in modern Catalan.  Ésser is considered the most standard, followed by ser and, distantly, esser. The verb seure remains as a distinct verb and is not considered a copula.

Estar

Usage

In Catalan, ésser and estar work in a way intermediate between those of Italian and Portuguese. A complete description of its rules of usage is as follows:

 When referring to inanimate objects, ser is used to tell about either permanent conditions inherent to the object (for example és vermell, "it is red"), unfinished qualities, or non-permanent conditions when there is no implication that there has been or there will be a change in state (for example, la sopa és calenta, "the soup is hot.") Ser is used to talk about a quality of an inanimate object in a given moment (without paying attention to other moments) or exactly the opposite: a quality of an inanimate object which is expected to be true in all moments of the existence of said object. Most uses of past participles as adjectives fall into this category when referring to inanimate objects.
 When referring to inanimate objects, estar is used to tell about non-permanent conditions when there is an implication of a finished change of state, an implication of a state in a known point of an evolution, or a temporal condition which is expected to change. In some way, estar introduces an adverbial sense to adjectives (for example, la sopa està calenta, "the soup is hot", as in "it has come to be hot.") Thus, both using ser and estar is correct in many contexts, but there is a difference in nuance.
 When referring to animate objects, ser is only used to tell about permanent conditions (for example és boig, "he is insane"; és mort, "he is dead.") Things traditionally thought of as permanent conditions also fall under this category, most notably ser casat/da, "to be married", and related terms. Ser is also used with the past participle of some unaccusative verbs such as néixer, which in medieval and dialectal Catalan made their compound tenses with ser.
 When referring to animate objects, estar is only used to tell about non-permanent conditions (for example estàs molt guapa, "you look good" as in "better than usual.")
 With fixed prepositional locutions, estar is most often used (for example, està en perill, "he/she/it is in danger"; està a punt, "he/she/it is ready.")
 When referring to location, ser is used when no time context is given (for example, els llibres són als prestatges, "the books are on the shelves.")
 When referring to location, estar is used when there is a sense of permanence (for example estic a Barcelona, "I live in Barcelona") or of a concrete time lapse (for example hi vam estar dues hores, "we were there for two hours.") In this case, pronominal particles might be added to the verb to emphasise the sentence (for example, ens hi vam estar dues hores.)
 Estar is always used with modal adverbs (for example estic bé, "I am all right").
 Estar is used to form the present continuous form estar + gerund, although some linguists think this is not a genuinely Catalan form, even though it is found on Medieval literature, for example that of Ausiàs March. Another undoubtedly genuine but perhaps too literary form is ser a + infinitive.
 Estat is used as the past participle of not only estar but also èsser/ser by many speakers, and this is considered the universal form.  However, many other speakers use a traditional regular past participle of èsser/ser: sigut, which is also accepted as standard in Central Catalan, although many linguists and speakers see it as colloquial. Another accepted form is sét, unlike the Valencian form segut, which causes confusion with the past participle of the verb seure, "to sit."

This can be summed up in five simple rules:

 Ser is always used to apply adjectives to inanimate objects except if there is a cause or a time lapse given for the condition of the adjective.
 Estar is always used to apply adjectives to animate objects if it is not a permanent state or characteristic of such animate object. However, some things that nowadays can be changed but before could not (or were not expected to) work like permanent characteristics (for example, nationality, beliefs, sex, looks, being married, degree of intelligence and degree of sanity.) Of course, even those can be expressed with estar if the animate object is acting as if they were his characteristics but they are not, or if the characteristics are more emphasised than usual. For example, és molt socialista, "she/he's a convinced socialist" vs. estàs molt socialista!, "you are being very socialist!"; és molt maca, "she is very beautiful" vs. està molt maca, "she looks very beautiful", as in "better than usual"; és mort, "he is dead" vs. està com mort, "he is acting as if he were dead."
 Ser is always used for locations except if there is a time lapse given or if the location actually means that someone works or lives in the indicated place.
 Estar is always used with modal adverbs and equivalents like fixed prepositional locutions.
 Estar is always used to express a point of an evolution or scale (for example, els termòmetres estan a 20 graus, "thermometers are at 20 degrees.")

"Animate objects" refers mainly to people, animals, and whatever is thought to be sentient (for example, a child playing with a doll will probably treat it as an animate object).

Italian

Italian copulas
The Italian copulas did not undergo the same development as in other languages, having preserved the Vulgar Latin forms essere and stare.

Essere

Stare

Usage 

Essere is the main copula. Stare refers to state rather than essence, but more narrowly than in Spanish. Essere is used for almost all cases in which English uses "to be".  It therefore makes sense to concentrate on the few uses of stare.
Stare means "to be", "to be feeling", or "to appear" with bene, male, meglio, come?, etc.: Come stai? "How are you?",  Sto bene "I am well."
Stare is used to form continuous forms of tenses: sto aspettando "I am waiting", Stavo parlando con... "I was speaking with..."
Stare'''s past participle stato has replaced that of essere, and so stato is used for "been" in all senses.Starci (lit. To stay in it) means "to fit" or "to assent to a proposal."Stare can be an alternative to restare "to stay."Stare is occasionally "to be located."  This is very common in the south of Italy for both transient and durable location, but only for durable location in the North. "Sta a Napoli" means "He/she is in Naples" in the South but "He/she lives in Naples" in the North.

Like the Spanish quedar, Italian uses rimanere, from Latin  (both meaning "to remain"), in the sense of "to be as a result"; e.g. È rimasta incinta = "she became pregnant (as a result)".

Sicilian

Sicilian copulas
The Sicilian copulas developed as follows:
 → èssere → (es)sere → siri → stare → stariSiri

Stari

Notes

The simple future is no longer in use.
The conditional tense of stari has also fallen into disuse.

 Usage 

In Sicilian, the meanings and usages of these two copulas are not as broad as in the other languages.  Siri is the dominant copula, even more so than in the other Romance languages and is used for almost all cases in which English uses “to be”.  Stari has been relegated to only a few common uses:Stari is used in combination with the gerund to form the progressive aspect:  = "I am speaking".Stari’s past participle, statu, replaced that of siri and thus statu is used for “been” in all senses.Stari has also replaced all other words meaning, "to reside":  = "I live in the United States".Stari, in combination with addritta, is also used to mean, “to stand up”.Stari in combination with the preposition pi can comport two meanings,
 1) when followed by a verb it means “about to” or “ready to”:  = "I am about to go", "I am leaving"; and
 2) in reference to an abbreviation, it means, “to stand for”: «USA» sta pi Stati Uniti di Mèrica = "'USA' stands for United States of America."Stari-cci, most likely an Italianism, is sometimes used to mean, “to fit”:  = "does this suit fit me [well]?" (cf. Italian non ci sto 'I don't fit in here/there').Siri is no longer in use as an auxiliary verb.  Aviri has completely replaced it in all verbs.

Occitan
Occitan has just one copula, estre; which is also written èsser, ester, estar in diverse dialects.

Estre

French

Modern French has only one copula. Old French, however, had estre ( → essere → *essre → estre) and ester ( → *estare → estar → ester).  The latter meant to ‘stand’, ‘stay’ or ‘stop’, and might have been used as a copula in a similar way to other Romance languages.  With phonetic evolution, the forms of each verb tended to be confused with one another, with the result that estre finally absorbed ester; around the same time, most words beginning with est- changed to ét- or êt-.  The modern form of the verb is être.

The only clear traces of ester (or éter if we bear in mind the loss of the s) in the modern copula are the past participle and the imperfect. Instead of the *étu one would expect, we find été – just what we would expect from ester/éter. The Old French imperfect was iere (from Latin ); this was replaced in Middle French by the imperfect of ester, which was estois (from Vulgar Latin *estaba, Latin ).

The present participle and all imperfect forms of être are regular and correspond to what one would expect for a verb with the stem êt-; however, they could also be considered as deriving from éter since the forms coincide.

Ester en justice has come to mean, "to act in a lawsuit", i.e. to appear in court as a party. This is a highly defective verb and mostly exists in the infinitive, although present and past participle are infrequently used as well.

Être

† Literary.

 Romansh 

Romansh has just one copula, esser. Star means, "to reside".

Esser

RomanianA fi, fire is the copula in Romanian. These infinitive forms evolved from the passive verb , "to become", "to be made":

 → fiere → fire → *fir → fi (fire)

In Latin  was used suppletively as the passive voice of  "to do", "to make".

Other forms of the verb a fi are derived from : sunt, ești, suntem, sunteți, sunt in the present tense and eram, erai, era, eram, erați, erau in the imperfect.A sta (stare) ( → sta) means "to stay" or even "to stand", "to stand still" or "to dwell/reside" e.g. a sta in picioare, as in Italian stare in piedi or unde stai? – "where do you live/reside?"

A fi

Sources of the Romance copula

  

  

† Demonstratives used when necessary.

For information on the morphological evolution of the Romance copula, see Romance verbs.

See also
Verb
Copula
Indo-European copula

Grammatical conjugation
Latin
Latin grammar
Latin declension
Latin conjugation
Vulgar Latin
Romance languages
Catalan language
Catalan grammar
Conjugation of auxiliary Catalan verbs
Conjugation of regular Catalan verbs
French language
French grammar
French verbs
French conjugation
Italian language
Italian grammar
Italian verbs
Portuguese language
Portuguese grammar
Portuguese conjugation
Romanian language
Romanian grammar
Romanian verbs
Romansh language
Sicilian language
Spanish language
Spanish grammar
Spanish conjugation
Spanish irregular verbs
Spanish verbs
Romance verbs
Romance-based Creole languages
French-based creole languages

Portuguese Creole
Cape Verdean Creole
Spanish-based creole languages

References

Notes

Bibliography
 Williams, E.B. From Latin to Portuguese Machado, J.P. Dicionário Etimológico da Língua Portuguesa''

Further reading

PDF documents, mainly on the Spanish copula

The Acquisition of the Verbs Ser and Estar in Undergraduate Students (in the US)
Acquisition of copulas ser and estar in Spanish: learning lexico-semantics, syntax and discourse
Grammaticalization of ser and estar in Romance languages

Indo-European linguistics
Romance languages

Strukturverben_(spanisch)